Tequila and Bonetti is an American crime comedy-drama television series starring Jack Scalia. The series originally aired on CBS, as a mid-season replacement, from January 17, 1992 to April 17, 1992, with only 10 of the 12 episodes aired. It was rebooted in 2000, for Italian television, with the Italian speaking Scalia returning as Bonetti.

Synopsis

The lead character of the series, Nico ("Nick") Bonetti, is a policeman from New York City who is proud of his Italian heritage and very fond of his vintage rose-colored Cadillac convertible, which he inherited from his father. After he erroneously shoots a young girl during a gunfight, he relocates to a beachfront Los Angeles precinct on temporary assignment. Here he meets his new partners, Tequila (a large, burrito-eating French Mastiff), and Officer Angela Garcia, who joined the department after her policeman husband's death, which she has kept a secret from her young daughter. Their boss is Captain Midian Knight, who is almost as interested in selling a screenplay as he is in police work. The series shows their investigations of crimes and the evolving relationships between the characters. This show has the peculiarity that television viewers are able to hear Tequila's thoughts.

Life is not easy for Bonetti, due to his remorse about the girl he shot and the strange habits of Californians whom he does not understand. His neighbors include a Puerto Rican psychic, who hears Tequila's thoughts but initially believes she is hearing spirits. Bonetti develops a grudging respect for the people around him as well as for Tequila, who despite his faults is an excellent police dog.  The dog is portrayed as having human-level intelligence and a street-wise, sassy attitude.

Each episode has a montage during which Bonetti plays piano and viewers see odd, sometimes disturbing scenes featuring Bonetti's neighbors and co-workers. Some of these scenes are from later episodes, while others remain unexplained. Each montage ends with Bonetti's memory of the shooting of the girl in New York.

Cast
Jack Scalia as Det. Nico "Nick" Bonetti
Charles Rocket as Capt. Midian Knight
Mariska Hargitay as Off. Angela Garcia
Brad Sanders as Tequila (voice)
Terry Funk as Sgt. Nuzo
W. K. Stratton as Detective Lee

In addition, Liz Torres recurs as psychic Gina Garcia, while series creator Donald P. Bellisario's daughter Troian recurs as Teresa Garcia, the young daughter of Hargitay's character.

Episodes

Cancellation
The series received negative reviews from critics, and was subsequently canceled by CBS four months after its premiere.

2000 series reboot
8 years later, Tequila & Bonetti was rebooted for television with Jack Scalia reprising his role as Bonetti; only this time, the show was filmed and aired in Italy. Bonetti goes to Rome to team up with a new "Tequila", a cross between a Saint Bernard and a golden retriever, and the policewoman Fabiana Sasso (Alessia Marcuzzi). Again, only the audience can hear the dog's thoughts, but this time Bonetti is the one with strange American habits, as seen by his new Italian friends.

References

External links

1990s American comedy-drama television series
1992 American television series debuts
1992 American television series endings
CBS original programming
English-language television shows
Television series by Universal Television
Television shows about dogs
Television shows set in Los Angeles
Television series created by Donald P. Bellisario
Police dogs in fiction